Hastings is a town in the Western Area Rural District of Sierra Leone. The town had a population of 15,054 (2004 census) and lies approximately 15 miles east of Freetown, the capital of the country.

Notable residents
Daniel Coker: African American Methodist missionary and immigrant from Baltimore, Maryland, to Sierra Leone in 1820; his descendants still live in Freetown
John Ulrich Graf: Anglican minister at St Thomas Church, Hastings 1837-1853
Francis Sundima Harding: Methodist Youth chairman, born Sierra Leone

External links
http://www.hastingshastings.org.uk/

Western Area
Neighbourhoods in Freetown
Sierra Leone Liberated African villages

Populated places established by Sierra Leone Creoles